Zheng Zhi (born 20 August 1980) is a Chinese professional footballer and manager who played most of his career for Chinese Super League club Guangzhou F.C., becoming their captain and serving also as their caretaker manager in two stints. After starting his career as a defender, Zheng was later moved into a central midfield role by then head coach Zhu Guanghu at Shenzhen Jianlibao and experienced immediate success there by winning the 2004 league title with the club. A move to Shandong Luneng Taishan saw a prolific goal scoring period in his career and he soon became the captain of the Chinese national team, which then led to moves to Charlton Athletic and Celtic. He moved back to China in 2010 and joined Guangzhou Evergrande, making over 300 appearances so far as captain while helping the club win all major trophies a Chinese club could compete for, including Chinese Super League for a record 8 times and AFC Champions League twice.

Club career

Early career
Zheng Zhi started his football career in 1990 playing for various Liaoning youth academies before playing for Liaoning Liaoqing in 1998 in the China League Two, starting out playing as a defender. In 2000, Liaoning Youth were involved in a legal battle between Yixing Industrial Co., Ltd. and Liaoning Sports School for the ownership of the club that saw all their assets frozen, including player transfer rights. This saw Zheng spend a year without playing professional football. In 2001, he was loaned to top-tier club Shenzhen Jianlibao who were coached by then manager Zhu Guanghu, his former manager during his time with the Chinese under-23 national team. He transferred to the club in November 2001 for a fee of ¥3.5 million. While he was initially deployed as a defender, he shifted into a more of a playmaker role and aided Shenzhen to the top tier title for the first time in the club's history. In January 2005, Zheng transferred to fellow Chinese Super League side Shandong Luneng Taishan for a transfer fee of ¥9.5 million.

Charlton Athletic
On 29 December 2006, Zheng was loaned out to Premier League side Charlton Athletic until the end of the season with an option to buy. He had been on trial with the club in November 2006. He made his debut for the club on 10 February 2007 in a 2–0 loss against Manchester United, coming on as a substitute for Amdy Faye. He scored his first goal on 18 March 2007 in a 2–0 win against Newcastle United.

Zheng returned to Shandong Luneng Taishan at the end of the 2006–07 season under the terms of his loan deal. He played once more for the club in a 6–1 loss against Beijing Guoan before he returned to Charlton on a permanent deal in August 2007. He joined for a fee of £2 million and signed a two-year contract with the club. He scored a total of seven league goals in the 2007–08 season; however, he was less effective in the second half of the season as a result of fatigue.

In the summer of 2008, Zheng was heavily linked with a transfer to West Bromwich Albion. Although Charlton were in negotiations with the club up to the end of the transfer window, the transfer failed to materialise. On 8 July 2009, Zheng left Charlton after failing to agree a new contract with the club following its relegation to League One.

Celtic
On 1 September 2009, Zheng transferred to Scottish Premier League side Celtic, signing a two-year contract and becoming the second Chinese footballer to sign for the club after Du Wei. Then manager Tony Mowbray affirmed his long held admiration for Zheng and expressed his delight at the signing. Zheng was unable to play for the club in the group stage of the 2009–10 UEFA Europa League after UEFA confirmed that he was not registered in time. He made his debut for the club on 4 October 2009 in a 2–1 loss against Rangers, winning a penalty. He scored his first goal for the club on 8 May 2010 in a 2–1 win against Heart of Midlothian. He was released by the club at the end of the 2009–10 season after failing to agree to a new contract.

Guangzhou Evergrande

On 28 June 2010, Zheng joined China League One side Guangzhou Evergrande on a free transfer. He made his debut for the club on 17 July 2010 in a 1–1 draw against Hubei Luyin. He scored first goal for the club 21 July 2010 in a 10–0 win against Nanjing Yoyo. In the 2010 season, Zheng scored five goals in 11 appearances as Guangzhou finished first place in the second division and won promotion back to the top tier.

After promotion to the Chinese Super League, Zheng took over as captain of the club as former captain Li Zhihai transferred to Guangdong Sunray Cave. Zheng scored five times in 25 appearances during the 2011 season as Guangzhou won the top tier title for the first time in the club's history, giving Zheng his third league title with three clubs. In the 2012 season, the club won the domestic double by winning the league title and the Chinese FA Cup; and in the 2013 season, won a third consecutive league title. In November 2013, Zheng captained Guangzhou to victory in the 2013 AFC Champions League Final as the club became the first Chinese club ever to win the AFC Champions League, and Zheng Zhi played the full game of the final，lifting the silverware as the captain. On 26 November 2013, Zheng was named the Asian Footballer of the Year by the Asian Football Confederation, becoming the second Chinese footballer to win the award after Fan Zhiyi in 2001.

On 27 October 2019, Zheng became the caretaker of the club when manager Fabio Cannavaro was temporarily relieved of his position and sent to corporate culture training until 3 November 2019.

On 5 December 2020, upon the club's elimination from the 2020 AFC Champions League group stage, Zheng was appointed General Manager of the club.

International career
Zheng joined the Chinese under-23 national team as the only player called up from the third tier. He made his debut for the Chinese national team on 7 December 2002 in a 3–1 win against Syria. He scored his first international goal on 29 January 2004 in a 1–0 win against Macedonia. After Zhu Guanghu took over as the manager in 2005, he was shifted into centre midfield and cemented his spot as the national team's first choice midfielder. Zheng captained the under-23 national team that competed at the 2008 Summer Olympics. Under Gao Hongbo's management, Zheng was appointed captain of the national team. In an interview on 3 August 2016, Zheng said, "This is the last time I will be in the final stage of FIFA World Cup qualification," indicating that after the 2018 FIFA World Cup, he would retire from the national team. On 2 June 2018, Zheng won his 100th cap for China in a 2–0 win against Thailand, making him the fourth Chinese footballer to win 100 caps.

Career statistics

Club statistics
Statistics accurate as of match played 8 November 2020.

International statistics

International goalsScores and results list China's goal tally first.''

Honours
Shenzhen Jianlibao
Chinese Super League: 2004

Shandong Luneng Taishan
Chinese Super League: 2006
Chinese FA Cup: 2006

Guangzhou Evergrande
Chinese Super League: 2011, 2012, 2013, 2014, 2015, 2016, 2017, 2019
China League One: 2010
AFC Champions League: 2013, 2015
Chinese FA Cup: 2012, 2016
Chinese FA Super Cup: 2012, 2016, 2017, 2018
Individual
AFC Asian Cup All-Star Team: 2004
Asian Footballer of the Year: 2013
AFC Champions League Dream Team: 2013, 2015
Chinese Football Association Player of the Year: 2002, 2006
Chinese Super League Team of the Year: 2002, 2003, 2004, 2005, 2006, 2012, 2013, 2014, 2015

See also
 List of men's footballers with 100 or more international caps

References

External links
 
 
 Zheng Zhi player profile at celticfc.net
 

1980 births
Living people
Footballers from Shenyang
Chinese footballers
China international footballers
Shenzhen F.C. players
Shandong Taishan F.C. players
Charlton Athletic F.C. players
Chinese expatriate footballers
Chinese Super League players
China League One players
Expatriate footballers in England
Premier League players
English Football League players
Celtic F.C. players
Expatriate footballers in Scotland
Scottish Premier League players
Guangzhou F.C. players
2004 AFC Asian Cup players
Footballers at the 2006 Asian Games
2007 AFC Asian Cup players
Footballers at the 2008 Summer Olympics
2015 AFC Asian Cup players
2019 AFC Asian Cup players
Olympic footballers of China
Asian Footballer of the Year winners
FIFA Century Club
Association football midfielders
Asian Games competitors for China
Association football player-managers